Wilhelm Friederich Hertenstein (5 May 1825, in Kyburg – 27 November 1888) was a Swiss politician.

Hertenstein was elected to the Swiss Federal Council on 21 March 1879 and died in office on 27 November 1888. He was affiliated to the Free Democratic Party of Switzerland. During his office time he held the Military Department and was President of the Confederation in 1888.

Hertenstein died while in office as President of the Confederation and is so far the only holder of this office who did not finish his term.

External links

References 

1825 births
1888 deaths
People from Pfäffikon District
Swiss Calvinist and Reformed Christians
Free Democratic Party of Switzerland politicians
Members of the Federal Council (Switzerland)
Members of the National Council (Switzerland)
Members of the Council of States (Switzerland)
Swiss military officers